Ferntree Creek is a national park in Queensland, Australia, 97 km north of Brisbane.

50 species of birds were recorded in the park, including the endangered gray goshawk. It is also a refuge for very unusual animals, such as the tusked frog.

The average elevation of the terrain is 57 meters.

References

See also

 Protected areas of Queensland

National Parks on the Sunshine Coast, Queensland
Protected areas established in 1947
1947 establishments in Australia